SOAS Working Papers in Linguistics are an outlet for research in progress conducted by staff, research students and research associates in the Department of Linguistics at the School of Oriental and African Studies (SOAS), University of London. The papers are open-access.

Volume 20 is the most recent edition in the series.

References 

Electronic Journals Library (EZB)

External links 
 http://www.soas.ac.uk/linguistics/research/workingpapers/

Open access journals
Linguistics journals